The 2020–21 Croatian Women's Football Cup was the 30th season of the annual Croatian football cup competition. Twenty three teams participated in the competition, all eight teams from the 2020–21 Croatian Women's First Football League and all teams from second level. The competition started on 13 September 2020 and ended on 3 June 2021 with the final in Krapina, a nominally neutral venue.

Matches

Preliminary round

Round of 16

Quarter-finals

Semi-finals

Final

Notes

References

External links
Competition rules 

2020 in Croatian women's sport
2021 in Croatian women's sport
Women's football in Croatia
Football competitions in Croatia